Orange-Nassau may refer to:
Principality of Orange-Nassau, a former state in what is now Germany.
House of Orange-Nassau, a royal family in multiple European states.
Order of Orange-Nassau, a Dutch order of chivalry.

See also
 Orange (disambiguation)
 Nassau (disambiguation)